Raymond Allen Radcliff (January 19, 1906 – May 23, 1962) was an American Major League Baseball outfielder and first baseman who appeared 1,081 games over ten seasons for the Chicago White Sox (–), St. Louis Browns (–) and Detroit Tigers (–).

Radcliff entered baseball in 1928 and joined the White Sox in September 1934 after seven prolific seasons in the minor leagues. He was known for his ability to make contact, striking out only once every 29 at bats. He batted .300 five times in his career and was a member of the American League squad for the 1936 Major League Baseball All-Star Game. On July 18, 1936, Radcliff went 6–for–7 with 4 runs and 4 RBI in a 21–14 win against the Philadelphia Athletics. His best season came in  when he hit .342 and finished ninth in American League MVP voting. 

During his ten-year career, Radcliff compiled a .311 batting average (1,267–4,074) with 42 home runs and 533 RBI. His career numbers include 598 runs scored, 205 doubles, 50 triples, 40 stolen bases, and 310 walks for a .362 on-base percentage and .417 slugging percentage. Defensively, he recorded a .971 fielding percentage playing at left and right field and first base.

After retiring from baseball, Radcliff was employed by a road machinery company, and died of a suspected heart attack at his Enid home in 1962.

See also
List of Major League Baseball single-game hits leaders

References

External links

1906 births
1962 deaths
American League All-Stars
Baseball players from Oklahoma
Chattanooga Lookouts players
Chicago White Sox players
Dallas Steers players
Detroit Tigers players
Greensboro Patriots players
Louisville Colonels (minor league) players
Major League Baseball left fielders
People from Pittsburg County, Oklahoma
St. Louis Browns players
St. Paul Saints (AA) players
Selma Cloverleafs players
Shreveport Sports players
Sportspeople from Enid, Oklahoma